is a Japanese politician of the Liberal Democratic Party, a member of the House of Councillors in the Diet (national legislature). A native of Meguro, Tokyo and graduate of the University of Tokyo, he worked at the Ministry of Finance from 1969 until 2001. He was elected to the House of Councillors for the first time in 2004.

References

External links 
  in Japanese.

Members of the House of Councillors (Japan)
University of Tokyo alumni
Living people
1947 births
People from Meguro
Liberal Democratic Party (Japan) politicians